Hesychotypa magnifica is a species of beetle in the family Cerambycidae. It was described by Martins and Galileo in 2007. It is known from Bolivia.

References

magnifica
Beetles described in 2007